Shri Vallabh Vyas was an Indian film and television actor. He was known for films including Sarfarosh (1999), Lagaan (2001), Abhay (2001), Aan: Men at Work (2004), Netaji Subhas Chandra Bose: The Forgotten Hero (2005), Sankat City (2009) and theater works such as Virasat (1985).

Personal life
On 13 October 2008 Vyas suffered a paralytic attack while shooting for a film. Due to the financial issues, his family moved from Jaisalmer to Jaipur for his treatment. According to his wife Shobha, the Cine and TV Artists Association (CINTAA) did not support him financially, despite the fact that the association had set up a trust for the actors who are suffering from losses. Actors Irrfan Khan, Manoj Bajpayee and Aamir Khan provided financial help for the Vyas family and for his treatment.

Death 
On January 7, 2018, Vyas died at the age of 59, in Jaipur, Rajasthan.

Selected filmography

Television

References

External links

Indian male film actors
2018 deaths
Indian male television actors
Indian Hindus
Male actors in Hindi cinema
National School of Drama alumni
20th-century Indian male actors
Male actors from Jaipur
21st-century Indian male actors
Male actors in Hindi television
1958 births